The sagyusam is a type of po (포), or outer robe in hanbok, Korean traditional clothing, which was worn by young boys until they had a coming-of-age ceremony called gwallye (관례). The name was derived from the shape; the lower end of the garment is divided into four parts.

See also
Bokgeon
Hanbok
Hogeon
Jeogori
List of Korean clothing

References

Korean clothing